Pterobunocephalus depressus is a species of banjo catfish that occurs in Argentina, Bolivia, Brazil, Ecuador, Paraguay and Venezuela.  It reaches a length of 8.9 cm.

References 
 

Aspredinidae
Fish of South America
Fish of Argentina
Fish of Bolivia
Fish of Brazil
Fish of Ecuador
Fish of Paraguay
Fish described in 1911